= Buddy G, My Two Moms and Me =

2007 cartoon

- Country of origin: United States
- Original language: English
- No. of episodes: 1

Production
- Executive producer: Margaux Towne-Colley
- Animator: 3D Magic Factory
- Production company: Us2

Original release
- Release: November 2007

Buddy G, My Two Moms and Me is a straight to DVD cartoon. Released in 2007, it was the first children's cartoon to feature a character with two mothers. It was intended to be a series, but only one episode, Lost Rings, was ever produced.

The cartoon was created by a lesbian couple from Omaha, Donna Colley and Margaux Towne-Colley. They wanted to create a show that their six-year-old son Grayson could relate to. Grayson voiced the titular character Buddy G, a 5-year-old boy with an armband computer named Socrates. Other characters include Buddy G's titular moms and his friend Owen.

It was screened at the 5th Annual San Diego International Children's Film Festival.
